Mohammed Ali Humaid Al-Siyabi (born 21 December 1988), commonly known as Mohammed Al-Siyabi, is an Omani footballer who plays for Al-Shabab Club.

Club career
On 8 July 2014, he agreed a one-year contract extension with Al-Shabab Club.

Club career statistics

International career
Mohammed is part of the first team squad of the Oman national football team. He was selected for the national team for the first time in 2011. He made his first appearance for Oman on 8 December 2012 against Lebanon in the 2012 WAFF Championship. He has made appearances in the 2012 WAFF Championship, the 2014 FIFA World Cup qualification and the 2015 AFC Asian Cup qualification.

National team career statistics

Goals for Senior National Team
Scores and results list Oman's goal tally first.

Honours

Club
With Al-Shabab
Omani League Runner-up: 2011–12

References

External links
 
 Mohammed Al Seyabi at Goal.com
 
 
 
 
 Mohammed Al Siyabi - ASIAN CUP Australia 2015

1988 births
Living people
People from Barka, Oman
Omani footballers
Oman international footballers
Association football midfielders
2015 AFC Asian Cup players
Al-Shabab SC (Seeb) players
Oman Professional League players